John Docherty (born 28 February 1935 in Glasgow) is a Scottish former professional footballer, who played as a wing half for football league club Colchester United and played Scottish league football for Albion Rovers, Stirling Albion, St Johnstone and Hearts.

References

External links

John Docherty Career Stats at coludata.co.uk

1935 births
Scottish footballers
Footballers from Glasgow
Maryhill F.C. players
Colchester United F.C. players
Albion Rovers F.C. players
Petershill F.C. players
Stirling Albion F.C. players
St Johnstone F.C. players
Heart of Midlothian F.C. players
Chelmsford City F.C. players
Living people
Association football wing halves
Scottish Football League players
English Football League players